Aygeshat, known as Ghuzigidan until 1950, is a village in the Armavir Province of Armenia.

References 

World Gazeteer: Armenia – World-Gazetteer.com

Populated places in Armavir Province
Yazidi populated places in Armenia